Vanchi LaShawn "Shawn" Jefferson Sr. (born February 22, 1969) is an American football coach and former wide receiver who is the wide receivers coach for the Carolina Panthers of the National Football League (NFL). He previously served as the associate head coach and wide receivers coach for the Arizona Cardinals from 2021 to 2022 and also previously served as an assistant coach for the New York Jets, Miami Dolphins, Tennessee Titans and Detroit Lions.

College career
Jefferson played college football at the University of Central Florida.

Professional career

Jefferson was selected by the Houston Oilers in the ninth round of the 1991 NFL Draft. In his career, Jefferson appeared in 195 games (along with 12 postseason games), and two Super Bowl appearances (Super Bowl XXIX and Super Bowl XXXI). He finished his career with 470 receptions for 7,023 yards and 29 touchdowns.

Coaching career

Detroit Lions
In 2006, Jefferson was hired by the Detroit Lions as an offensive assistant. In 2007, he was promoted to wide receivers coach.

Tennessee Titans
In 2013, Jefferson was hired by the Tennessee Titans as their wide receivers coach.

Miami Dolphins
On January 12, 2016, Jefferson was hired by the Miami Dolphins as their wide receivers coach under head coach Adam Gase.

New York Jets
In 2019, Jefferson followed Gase to be his assistant head coach and wide receivers coach with the New York Jets.

Arizona Cardinals
On January 19, 2021, Jefferson was hired by the Arizona Cardinals as their wide receivers coach under head coach Kliff Kingsbury, replacing David Raih. On May 10, 2022, Jefferson was promoted to associate head coach.

Personal life
Jefferson's son is Van Jefferson, a wide receiver for the Los Angeles Rams. He played college football at Ole Miss and Florida.

References

External links
 Arizona Cardinals profile
Detroit Lions profile

1969 births
Living people
American football wide receivers
Atlanta Falcons players
Detroit Lions coaches
Detroit Lions players
Miami Dolphins coaches
New England Patriots players
New York Jets coaches
San Diego Chargers players
Tennessee Titans coaches
UCF Knights football players
William M. Raines High School alumni
Players of American football from Jacksonville, Florida
African-American coaches of American football
African-American players of American football
Arizona Cardinals coaches
21st-century African-American people
20th-century African-American sportspeople
Ed Block Courage Award recipients
Carolina Panthers coaches